Ryan Otto Cassata (born December 13, 1993) is an American musician, public speaker, writer, filmmaker, and actor. Cassata speaks at high schools and universities on the subject of gender dysphoria, being transgender, bullying and his personal transition from female to male, including top surgery in January 2012, when he was 18 years old. He has made appearances on Larry King Live and The Tyra Banks Show to talk about being transgender. He has performed at LGBT music festivals and has gone on tours across the United States of America. Cassata has performed at popular music venues such as Jazz at Lincoln Center, Whisky a Go Go, The Saint, The Bitter End, SideWalk Cafe, Turf Club (venue) and Bowery Poetry Club. Cassata won a date on Warped Tour 2013 through the Ernie Ball Battle of the Bands online competition and performed on the Acoustic Basement Stage on June 21, 2013 becoming the first openly transgender performer to play at the Vans Warped Tour. Cassata also won a date on Warped Tour 2015 through the Ernie Ball Battle of the Bands and performed on the Ernie Ball Stage on June 20, 2015.

Cassata composed the soundtrack for the 2010 short film "Loop Planes" which screened at various film festivals including the Tribeca Film Festival, South by Southwest Gay & Lesbian Film Festival, and Hamptons International Film Festival. "Distraction" and "Sleeping Through" from Cassata's 2011 EP "Distraction" make up the soundtrack. Cassata is the main subject of the full feature Danish produced documentary Songs for Alexis. Songs for Alexis, produced by Copenhagen Bombay with help from the Danish Film Institute, had its world premiere at Hot Docs Canadian International Documentary Festival to a sold-out crowd on April 30, 2014. Songs for Alexis had its United States premiere at Frameline Film Festival on June 28, 2014. Songs for Alexis also screened and sold out at DOC NYC. Indiewire listed Songs for Alexis on its "10 Films You must Watch at Frameline 2014" article.

Activism
Since 2007, Ryan Cassata has presented at high schools, universities, support groups and conferences on topics such as coming out, Gender Identity Disorder, transgenderism, sex reassignment surgery, substance dependence and bullying. Cassata also speaks about his experience as the first openly transgender student in Bay Shore High School and the changes he made there. Cassata talks about the petitions he made in Bay Shore High School to advocate for the rights of transgender students. He has discussed bullying, what gendered bathroom to use, and gaining the right to have his chosen name in the school yearbook instead of his name at birth. Cassata tells personal stories using speech, original songs and poetry and his own YouTube videos.

In 2012, Cassata became the youngest keynote speaker that the Philadelphia Trans-Health Conference ever elected. Ryan Cassata uses his music videos to discuss social justice topics such as bullying. His 2012 music video, "Hands of Hate" released on YouTube honors and remembers LGBT Youth who were murdered or committed suicide. He donated a portion of the proceeds to The Trevor Project. The lyrics of "Hands of Hate" discuss the murder of Matthew Shepard, the murder of Larry King, and the suicides of Tyler Clementi and Jamey Rodemeyer. Larry King is honored in the second verse:

Ryan Cassata raised money with the Frank Cassata Family Foundation and Underworks in 2014 to provide over 400 transgender youth with new chest binders.

In 2015, Ryan Cassata appeared on the San Francisco Trans March line-up with Laverne Cox.

Ryan Cassata has spent time in Hot Springs, Arkansas and Little Rock, Arkansas educating the town through public speeches about the transgender community and screenings of Songs for Alexis.  He also performed concerts at festivals and venues around the state.

Cassata has delivered speeches and performances at colleges and universities such as Kent State University, Carnegie Mellon University, Boston University, University of Southern California, Capital University, Rider University, Rutgers University, Central Washington University, San Francisco State University, Binghamton University, Dominican University of California, University of New Hampshire, State University of New York at Purchase, State University of New York at New Paltz, Ursinus College, State University of New York at Old Westbury, Farmingdale State College, St. Joseph's University, William Paterson University, Dowling College and Mount St. Joseph University.

Cassata has delivered speeches and performances at high schools such as Bay Shore High School, David H. Hickman High School, Rumson-Fair Haven Regional High School, Amityville Memorial High School, Ossining High School, Kingston High School, Monmouth Regional High School, Strong Vincent Middle School, Rancho Cotate High School, Freedom High School (Oakley, California) and Dougherty Valley High School. 

Bustle (magazine) put Ryan Cassata on the "7 Young Trans* Activists You Should Know About This Year" list in 2016 saying "he's also become one of the most prominent young trans* activist speakers in America."

Cassata has appeared on Larry King Live, The Tyra Banks Show and local television to speak about being transgender. He also appeared on CNN live to advocate for gender neutral bathrooms.

Music career
Ryan Cassata's song "Soda Cans" was listed in the 2014 article by The Advocate as a 'Trans Anthem.' Ryan Cassata was listed on Logo TV's list of "9 Trans Musicians You Need to Get Into."' Cassata and his song "We're The Cool Kids" were listed on the 2017 Billboard list of 11 Transgender and Non-Binary Musicians You Need to Know.

Ryan Cassata is the first openly transgender musician to perform at Warped Tour after winning the Ernie Ball Battle of The Bands contest in 2013 and 2015.

Ryan Cassata's music video for his song "Other Friends" was featured in Billboard Magazine in 2019 with an in-depth interview and was featured on the front page of the website. The song "Daughter" was featured again in Billboard Pride's article "50 Stellar Songs by LGBTQ Artists That You Might Have Missed in 2018 (But Shouldn't Have)" Ryan Cassata and his song "Daughter" were also featured in Paper Magnifiine's article titled "50 LGBTQ Musicians You Should Prioritize" in 2018.

Ryan Cassata is one of two of the 2019 recipients of The ASCAP Foundation "Sunlight of the Spirit" Award which is presented to an individual who is exemplary in recovery and in music creativity for his original song "Jupiter." Ryan Cassata performed at The ASCAP Foundation Honors 2019 at Jazz at Lincoln Center and accepted his award.

YouTube
Cassata began creating vlogs and uploading footage from his concerts in 2007. Cassata posts videos on his personal YouTube channel, Ryan Cassata talking about his experience as a transgender man, a musician, and a public speaker.  his channel has over 76.5 thousand subscribers, and his videos have been viewed over 6.7 million times. Ryan Cassata has collaborated on videos with Davey Wavey, Skylar Kergil, Aydian Dowling, ElloSteph, Arielle Scarcella, Marissa Farina, and Stevie Boebi. Cassata became the first transgender person on the LGBT Panel at Playlist Live in February 2015 and appeared with Stevie Boebi, ElloSteph, Marissa Farina, RJ Aguiar, and Tyler Oakley.

Cassata was a regular member on the collaboration YouTube channel LGBTeens a channel that has over 35,000 subscribers and was part of the Big Frame network. Cassata vlogged about the LGBT community and his personal experience as an openly LGBT teen on this channel.

He has been rated as one of the "top 5 most influential transgender YouTube creators" by NewMediaRockstars.

Acting
In June 2015, Ryan Cassata was cast as a lead character in Beemus directed by Lauren Wolkstein. Cassata played a high school gym student. Cassata won the award for "Best Breakout Performance" at the Victoria TX Independent Film Fest in March 2016. Cassata appeared in a Bonobos (apparel) national commercial titled "However You Fit" in 2018 which featured 172 men wearing the same style of pants.

Notable awards & honors
 Harvey Milk Memorial Award
 Ernie Ball Battle of The Bands winner, featured on Warped Tour 2013 
 Ernie Ball Battle of The Bands winner, featured on Warped Tour 2015 
 KPQR, 99.1 FM Music Community Member of the Year Award 
 Best Breakout Performance for "Beemus, It'll End In Tears" at Victoria TX Independent Film Festival 
 Best Music Short for "Daughter" at New Renaissance Film Festival, Amsterdam 2019
 Certificate of Congressional Recognition, California's 36th congressional district, 2019
 Proclamation, City of Palm Springs, CA - Recognized for Transgender Activism, 2019
 Proclamation, City of Rancho Mirage, CA - Recognized for Transgender Activism, 2019
 Proclamation, Cathedral City, CA - Recognized for Transgender Activism, 2019
 Proclamation, City of Palm Desert, CA - Recognized for Transgender Activism, 2019 
 Proclamation, City of La Quinta - Recognized for Transgender Activism, 2019
 The ASCAP Foundation "Sunlight of the Spirit" Award, 2019

Discography

LPs 

The Theme of Humankind (Artemendous Records, May 28, 2011)
Track Listing:

Musicians:
 
Production:

The Rhythm (ROC Productions, May 25, 2012)
Track Listing:

Musicians:
 
Production:
 
 
Songs for Alexis (Original Soundtrack Recording) (ROC Productions, April 30, 2014)
Track Listing: 

Soul Sounds (ROC Productions, February 21, 2015)
Track Listing: 

Musicians:
 
Production:

Shine (ROC Productions, March 15, 2016) 
Track Listing: 

Musicians:  
Production:

The Witches Made Me Do It (ROC Productions, March 27, 2020) 

Track Listing: 

Musicians:  
Production:

Magic Miracle Mile (ROC Productions, October, 22nd, 2021) 

Track Listing: 

Musicians:  
Production:

EPs
Distraction (January 12, 2011)
Track Listing:

Musicians:
 
Production:

Oh, Alexis: Acoustic Sessions, Vol. 1 (ROC Productions, December 13, 2012)

Track Listing: 

Production: 

In America: The Acoustic Sessions, Vol. 2 (ROC Productions, April 13, 2013)

Track Listing: 

Production: 

Jupiter, It Won't Be Long: The Acoustic Sessions, Vol. 3 (ROC Productions, September 13, 2013)
Track Listing: 

Production: 

Chicago Midway: The Acoustic Sessions, Vol. 4 (ROC Productions, April 13, 2014)
Track Listing: 

Production: 

Virginia, Pick Up The Phone (ROC Productions, July 7, 2017)
Track Listing: 

Production:

Singles
Captain May (May 2014)

Musicians:

Production:

Look At The World (January 2016)

Musicians:
Jon Jeremy, Tormented, Ryan Cassata 

Light Up (August 2017)

Musicians:
 
Production:

Daughter  (April 2018)

Musicians:

Production:

It's Christmastime  (December 2018)

Musicians & Production:

Jupiter (March 2019)

Musicians:

Production:

Back Down South (May 2019)

Musicians:

Production:

Filmography

Television

Theater credits
 Readings & Workshops
Albert Cashier as Young Albert (2017)
This Ain't No Disco! as Ensemble (2017)
Cotton Candy and Cocaine as Blazer (2017)

Publications

Ryan Cassata currently writes for Rock The Pigeon Music Blog.

Bibliography

Contributions 
 2014 – Trans Bodies, Trans Selves: A Resource for the Transgender Community – Laura Erickson-Schroth (Youth Chapter, advisor)
 2016 – The i’Mpossible Project – Joshua Riverdal (Learning to Love You)
 2016 – The ABC's of LGBT+ – Ash Hardell (Identities and Terms)
 2019 – Original Plumbing: The Best of Ten Years of Trans Male Culture – Edited by Amos Mac and Rocco Kayiatos (Home)

Music videos

References 

1993 births
Transgender musicians
Transgender rights activists
American LGBT musicians
LGBT people from New York (state)
Living people
American LGBT rights activists
American folk rock musicians
American indie rock musicians
Musicians from New York (state)
Transgender artists
People from Stony Brook, New York
People from Bay Shore, New York
Transgender male actors
American male actors
Transgender male musicians
Transgender writers